The Patricia and Phillip Frost Art Museum (Frost Art Museum) is an art museum located in the Modesto A. Maidique campus of  Florida International University (FIU) in Miami, Florida. It was founded in 1977 as 'The Art Museum at Florida International University' and was renamed 'The Patricia & Phillip Frost Art Museum' in 2003.

The museum is recognized for its collection of Latin American and 20th century American art, Haitian paintings, and a growing number of works by contemporary artists, especially from Latin American and Caribbean countries. In 1999, the museum received accreditation from the American Alliance of Museums (AAM), and it is also a member of the Smithsonian Affiliations program.

From the community, the Frost Art Museum has earned the accolade "Miami's Best Museum" (South Florida's New Times, 1996, 1994, 1993) and "Miami's Best Art Museum 2009 (Miami New Times)."

Principal collections
The Frost Art Museum's Permanent Collection includes nearly 6,000 objects from several distinctive collections: the General Collection, the Metropolitan Museum and Art Center Collection and the Betty Laird Perry Emerging Artist Collection.

The General Collection holds American printmaking from the 1960s and 1970s, photography, Pre-Columbian objects dating from 200 to 500 AD, and a growing number of works by contemporary Caribbean and Latin American artists. The museum continues to expand the collection through private donations, purchases and acquisitions.
The Metropolitan Museum and Art Center Collection, was donated to the Frost Art Museum in order to ensure its intact survival in 1989, when the Metropolitan Museum and Art Center of Coral Gables, Florida closed.  This collection of more than 2,300 objects includes sculptures, photographs, paintings by 20th century figures, a collection of American prints from the 1960s, sculptural works, photographs, Japanese Netsukes and ancient bronzes from Asian and African cultures.
 In support of the university's studio arts program, the Betty Laird Perry Emerging Artist Collection comprises artworks obtained through purchase awards granted to selected BFA and MFA students graduating from the program since 1980.  Numerous award recipients have continued to garner national and international recognition as mature artists.

Architecture
From 1977 to 2008, the museum was housed in less than 7,000 interior square feet of Primera Casa, an FIU administration building, located in the heart of the campus. Determined to reach "the broadest audience possible," The Frost Art Museum expanded its premises to create an outdoor sculpture program, containing 57 works by sculptors of the contemporary art world.

New building

The new Frost Art Museum was designed by Yann Weymouth of Hellmuth Obata + Kassabaum (HOK). The  facility opened in November, 2008. The structure features a three-story glass entrance atrium with a suspended staircase leading to the second and third floors. In addition to the atrium, the ground floor houses a café and museum shop, the Dahlia Morgan Members' Lounge, as well as the Steven & Dorothea Green Auditorium and Lecture Hall.

The gallery lighting was designed by Arup Group Lighting and is noteworthy for the prominent use of natural daylight, which is collected through a system of skylights and diffusing petal arrays. Three of the nine galleries are dedicated to the permanent collection, while the remaining six galleries feature temporary exhibitions.

On its tranquil lakeside site, the new building frames the "Avenue of the Arts."  Accentuated by selected works from the museum's outdoor sculpture collection, the Avenue of the Arts connects the museum, the Wertheim Performing Arts Center and the Management and Advanced Research Center (MARC) on the Modesto A. Maidique campus.

Exhibitions
As the new museum strives to develop its international standard, the Frost Art Museum has held exhibitions showcasing work from a variety of regions including: the Caribbean, East Asia, India and South Florida. The museum has also paid close attention to the wide range of styles in the world of contemporary art.

Gallery

See also
Education in Miami

References

External links

Article on Miami's only free Museum
The Sculpture Park at Florida International University
Patricia & Phillip Frost Art Museum within Google Arts & Culture

1977 establishments in Florida
Art museums established in 1977
Art museums and galleries in Florida
Florida International University
Institutions accredited by the American Alliance of Museums
Museums in Miami
Museums of American art
Smithsonian Institution affiliates
University museums in Florida